Sun City may refer to:

Places

United States
 Sun City, Arizona, Del Webb's original "Sun City" development, and model for subsequent communities
 Sun City Festival (Buckeye, Arizona)
 Sun City, California
 Sun City Center, Florida
 Sun City, Florida
 Sun City, Kansas
 Sun City, Summerlin, Nevada
 Sun City, Hilton Head, South Carolina
 Sun City, Texas
 A nickname of El Paso, Texas

Other places
 Sun City (South Africa), a luxury casino resort, situated in the North West Province of South Africa
 Translation of Cité Soleil, a Haitian commune
 A nickname of Cagliari, Sardinia
 A nickname of Szeged, Hungary
 A nickname of Écija, Spain ("la ciudad del sol")

Television
 Sun City (TV series)

Music 
 "Sun City" (song), a 1985 protest song by Artists United Against Apartheid
 Sun City (album), a 1985 album by Artists United Against Apartheid
 Sun City Girls, American rock band
 Suncity, a 2018 EP by American singer Khalid

See also 
 Heliopolis (disambiguation)
 City of the Sun (disambiguation)
 Sun City Agreement of the Second Congo War, signed 2002 in Sun City, South Africa
 Sunshine City (disambiguation)